Fraser Sopik (born April 3, 1997) is a professional Canadian football linebacker for the Hamilton Tiger-Cats of the Canadian Football League (CFL).

University career
Sopik played U Sports football for the Western Mustangs from 2015 to 2018. He won the Bruce Coulter Award in 2017 as the most valuable defensive player in Western's Vanier Cup win that year. He also won the Presidents' Trophy in his final year with Western in 2018.

Professional career

Calgary Stampeders
Sopik was drafted in the fourth round, 31st overall, by the Stampeders in the 2018 CFL Draft and signed with the team to a two-year contract on May 13, 2019. He played in his first professional game in the team's 2019 season opener on June 15, 2019 against the Ottawa Redblacks where he had one defensive tackle and one special teams tackle. He later recorded his first career sack on July 6, 2019 against Cody Fajardo of the Saskatchewan Roughriders in a game where he also had a season-high four defensive tackles. In his rookie year, he dressed in all 18 regular season games where he recorded 13 defensive tackles, 10 special teams tackles, two sacks, two forced fumbles, and a blocked punt.

Sopik did not play in 2020 due to the cancellation of the 2020 CFL season. On January 11, 2021, he avoided free agency and signed a contract extension with the Stampeders. He became a free agent upon the expiry of his contract on February 14, 2023.

Hamilton Tiger-Cats
On February 15, 2023, it was announced that Sopik had signed with the Hamilton Tiger-Cats.

References

External links
 Hamilton Tiger-Cats bio
 

1997 births
Living people
Calgary Stampeders players
Canadian football linebackers
Hamilton Tiger-Cats players
Western Mustangs football players
Players of Canadian football from Ontario
Canadian football people from Toronto